The Central Brooklyn Jazz Consortium (CBJC) is a not for profit arts organization. Jitu Weusi was one of the co-founders.  CBJC organized an annual jazz festival in Central Brooklyn, New York and created the Brooklyn Jazz Hall of Fame and Museum. The festival occurs every April.

This music series is New York City's longest running festival dedicated to straight ahead jazz. This celebration of jazz presents 35 events on 23 days with more than 100 musicians performing in clubs,  venues, colleges, faith-based and cultural institutions throughout this borough of New York City. Brooklynites, jazz musicians such as Cecil Payne, Betty Carter, and Kenny Durham as well as less heralded artists Cal Massey, Betty Roche, Gigi Gryce, and C. Scoby Stroman contributions are remembered by way of conferences and performances.

Brooklyn jazz hall of fame
 Ahmed Abdul-Malik
 Roland Alexander
 Chief Bey
 Eubie Blake
 Art Blakey
 Joe Carroll
 Betty Carter
 Kenny Dorham
 Leonard Gaskin
 Gigi Gryce
 Ernie Henry
 Lena Horne
 Freddie Hubbard
 Cal Massey
 Carmen McRae
 Montego Joe
 Cecil Payne
 Noel Pointer
 Max Roach
 Betty Roché
 Hazel Scott
 Ulysses Slaughter
 Clifton Small
 C. Scoby Stroman
 Wally Gator Watson
 Mary Lou Williams

References

Musical groups established in 1999
Non-profit organizations based in Brooklyn
Music of New York City
1999 establishments in New York City
Jazz festivals in New York City
Music festivals in New York City
Jazz in New York City